The Les Bartley Award is given annually to the National Lacrosse League head coach of the year. The award was simply called the Head Coach of the Year award until 2004, when the award was renamed in honour of Les Bartley, the most successful coach in NLL history.

This award is distinct from the Les Bartley Award given out by the Toronto Rock.

Past winners

References

National Lacrosse League awards
Coaching awards
Awards established in 2001